Olivier Roy (born 1949 in La Rochelle) is a French political scientist, professor at the European University Institute in Florence, Italy. He has published articles and books on secularisation and Islam including "Global Islam", and The Failure of Political Islam. He is known to have "a different view of radical Islam" than some other experts, seeing it as peripheral, Westernized and part of a radicalized and "virtual" rather than pious and "actual" Muslim community. More recently he has written on the Charlie Hebdo shooting, and the November 2015 Paris attacks.

Early life 
Roy was born in 1949 in La Rochelle.
Roy received an agrégation in philosophy and a master's degree in Persian language and civilization in 1972 from the French Institut National des Langues et Civilisations Orientales. In 1973 he worked as high school teacher. In the 1970s he was active in the maoist movement "La Gauche prolétarienne" (Proletarian Left). In 1996, he received his PhD in political science from the IEP.

Career 

He was previously a research director at the French National Center for Scientific Research (CNRS) and a lecturer for both the School for Advanced Studies in the Social Sciences (EHESS) and the Institut d'Études Politiques de Paris (IEP).

From 1984 to 2008, he was a consultant for the French Foreign Ministry. In 1988, Roy served as a United Nations Office for Coordinating Relief in Afghanistan (UNOCA) consultant. Beginning in August 1993, Roy served as special Organization for Security and Co-operation in Europe (OSCE) representative to Tajikistan until February 1994, at which time he was selected as head of the OSCE mission to Tajikistan, a position he held until October 1994.

Roy is the author of books on Iran, Islam and Asian politics. These works include Globalized Islam: The search for a new ummah, Today's Turkey: A European State? and The Illusions of September 11. He also serves on the editorial board of the academic journal Central Asian Survey.
His best-known book, L'Echec de l'Islam politique (1992) (The Failure of Political Islam) (1994), is a standard text for students of political Islam.

Roy wrote widely on the 2005 civil unrest in France, rebutting the suggestion that the violence was religiously inspired.  He argues that Islamism is merely the rubric under which troubled youth enact their violent inclinations.  A view adamantly opposed by Roy's intellectual rival, Gilles Kepel.

According to Judith Miller, in the wake of the September 11 attacks Olivier argued that militant Islamism of the type represented by Al Qaeda had peaked and was fading into insignificance.

His book Secularism Confronts Islam (Columbia, 2007) offers a perspective on the place of Islam in secular society and looks at the diverse experiences of Muslim immigrants in the West. Roy examines how Muslim intellectuals have made it possible for Muslims to live in a secularized world while maintaining the identity of a "true believer."

In 2010 he published Holy Ignorance, When Religion and Culture Part Ways, an analysis of religion, ethnicity and culture and the results when these part ways.

After the Charlie Hebdo shooting he argued that most French Muslims were committed to prevent violence, and after the November 2015 Paris attacks, he wrote a strategic analysis of ISIS and the fight against it, published in The New York Times.

In 2017, Roy's assertion that jihadi terrorism is only loosely connected to Islamic fundamentalism was criticised by French scholar Gilles Kepel, who said that Roy neither speaks Arabic nor looks into the Salafi doctrine behind the jihadism. Roy has said "I have been accused of disregarding the link between terrorist violence and the religious radicalisation of Islam through Salafism, the ultra-conservative interpretation of the faith. I am fully aware of all of these dimensions; I am simply saying that they are inadequate to account for the phenomena we study, because no causal link can be found on the basis of the empirical data we have available."

Other activities
 Former European Council on Foreign Relations (ECFR), Member

Bibliography 

Généalogie de l'islamisme, Paris Hachette, 1995

Further reading 
Mathieu Perreault, February 2nd, Journal La Presse, Montreal

References

External links
Website in French Link to English Language Website On Site
Washington Post, PostGlobal Panelist
Biography and Articles on Le Monde Diplomatique
Interview with Olivier Roy: "Full Equality before the Law for All Religions"
The Crisis of the Secular State and the New Forms of Religious Expression by Olivier Roy at France Diplomatie

1949 births
Living people
Islam and politics
Sciences Po alumni
INALCO alumni
French scholars of Islam
French orientalists
Academic staff of the School for Advanced Studies in the Social Sciences
Academic staff of the European University Institute
French political scientists
20th-century French historians